Vincent Solano (1923 – November 16, 1992) was an Italian-American gangster, a caporegime for the Chicago Outfit who ran a corrupt Laborers Union local in Chicago.

A longtime organized crime figure on Chicago's North Side, Solano served as chauffeur and bodyguard to mobster Ross Prio. After Prio's death in 1972, Solano succeeded him as head of the Rush Street Crew, which covered most of Northern Chicago and the adjoining suburbs.  In 1977, Solano was elected union president of the Local 1 of the Laborers' International Union of North America, which included syndicate members Joseph Aiello, Sal Gruttadauro, Frank De Monte and Frank Colaianni as business managers.

According to Ken Eto, a former crew member, Solano used the Local 1 union hall to run illegal gambling, extortion and prostitution rackets.  In February 1983, Eto was convicted on a gambling charge. Afraid that Eto might strike a deal with the government for leniency, Solano allegedly ordered Eto's death. Two hit men approached Eto in his car on a Chicago street and shot him three times in the head. However, Eto managed to survive. Their failure to kill Eto was blamed on an insufficient amount of powder in the bullet cartridges. The two gunmen had packed their own ammunition to reduce their chances of being traced to Eto's murder. Eto later became a government witness.  Five months after the unsuccessful hit, the two gunmen were found strangled and stabbed to death.

On November 16, 1992, Vincent Solano died of natural causes at his home in Lisle, Illinois.

References

Further reading
Capeci, Jerry. The Complete Idiot's Guide to the Mafia. Indianapolis: Alpha Books, 2002. 
Fitch, Robert. Solidarity For Sale: How Corruption Destroyed the Labor Movement and Undermined America's Promise. New York: PublicAffairs, 2006. 
United States. Congress. House. Committee on the Judiciary. Subcommittee on Crime. Administration's Efforts Against the Influence of Organized Crime in the Laborer's International Union. 1997. 
United States. Congress. Senate. Committee on Governmental Affairs. Permanent Subcommittee on Investigations. Hotel Employees & Restaurant Employees International Union: hearings before the Permanent Subcommittee on Investigations. 1984. 
United States. Congress. Senate. Committee on Governmental Affairs. Permanent Subcommittee on Investigations. Organized Crime in Chicago: Hearing Before the Permanent Subcommittee on Investigations of the Committee on Governmental Affairs. 1983.

External links
Chicago Tribune, April 23, 1985, Eto Blames Union Aide For Attempted Mob Hit  by Ronald Koziol and John O`Brien
IPSN, August 10, 1997 Laborers' Union Hearings Reveal Endless Mob Saga 
Methvin, Eugene H."A Union in Bondage to the Mob" . Reader's Digest.
Chicago Sun-Times, Jun 8, 2006, Mobster 'Toyko Joe' died in Georgia in '04: Ken Eto survived a 1983 hit, by Steve Warmbir

1992 deaths
American gangsters of Italian descent
Chicago Outfit mobsters
Year of birth uncertain
1923 births